By Myself (stylized as by myself) is the second studio album by Japanese singer Hitomi, released on September 11, 1996 via Avex Trax. The album was a commercial success reaching #1 in the Oricon weekly charts and remaining in the chart for 12 consecutive weeks.  Total album sales exceeded 808,000 in Japan, making By Myself hitomi's most commercially successful album.

Track listing

References
 Official Hitomi Site
 Official Hitomi discography
 Oricon archive of By Myself

Hitomi albums
1996 albums
Avex Trax albums
Dance-pop albums by Japanese artists
Albums produced by Tetsuya Komuro